Chortopodisma is a monotypic genus of insect in the family Acrididae. Its only recognized species is Chortopodisma cobellii.

Description
Chortopodisma cobellii is similar to Pseudoprumna baldensis. Wings do not exist. The hearing organ is reduced to small remains. The body is light green colored. This species has in contrast to other wingless mountain locusts a strong shortened dark band on the flanks of the body.

Distribution and mode of life
This species is endemic to the Italian Alps. Adult specimens can be found from August to October.

References

Acrididae
Endemic fauna of Italy
Insects described in 1883 
Insects described in 1951 

Taxa named by Hermann August Krauss
Monotypic Orthoptera genera